Narjot may refer to:

Narjot de Toucy (disambiguation), four members of the same noble European family
Ernest Narjot (1826–1898), American painter